The Holy Sponge is one of the Instruments of the Passion of Jesus. It was dipped in vinegar (in some translations sour wine), most likely posca, a regular beverage of Roman soldiers, and offered to Jesus to drink from during the Crucifixion, according to Matthew 27:48, Mark 15:36, and John 19:29.

History

Jerusalem
An object thought to be the Holy Sponge was venerated in Israel, in the Upper Room of the Constantinian basilica, where Sophronius of Jerusalem spoke of it :

Rome
In the Basilica di San Giovanni in Laterano in Rome, a brown sponge is venerated. Other pieces of sponge are present at the following:
 the Basilica di Santa Maria Maggiore
 the Basilica di Santa Maria in Trastevere
 St. Mary in Campitelli

Gerusalemme
The Chapel of the Relics at Santa Croce in Gerusalemme houses another sponge:

Constantinople and France
In the 7th century, Nicetas took part in the conquest of Egypt from Phocas. He was famed for bringing items he claimed were the Holy Sponge and the Holy Lance (the "Lance of Longinus") to Constantinople from Palestine in 612. From 619 to 628/9 he may anecdotally have been exarch of Africa.

This sponge remained in Constantinople until it was bought from the Latin emperor Baldwin II by Louis IX of France among the relics he needed for the Sainte-Chapelle in Paris. Participants in the French Revolution dispersed these relics (including the Crown of Thorns and a bit of the True Cross). Some went briefly to the Bibliothèque Nationale. Later, however, they were restored to Notre-Dame de Paris.

Other claimants
Other parties also claiming access to the Holy Sponge include:
 the church of St. Jacques de Compiègne in France
 Aachen's cathedral (Charlemagne's sample)

See also
Relics associated with Jesus
Arma Christi
Crown of thorns
Lance of Longinus
Titulus Crucis
True Cross
Xylospongium

References

External links
 Marc A. Beherec, "Gazetteer of Relics"
Sophronius of Jerusalem celebrates the relics of the Passion, ca 600 A.D.

Relics associated with Jesus
Gospel of Matthew
Gospel of Mark
Gospel of John
Church of the Holy Sepulchre
Cleaning tools